Heer Ranjha (Gurmukhi: ਹੀਰ ਰਾਂਝਾ;) is a Pakistani Punjabi film released in 1970, based on the classic epic story of Heer Ranjha by the Sufi poet Waris Shah.

The film is ranked among the critics and users' poll of "Top ten Pakistani films" conducted by British Film Institute.

Plot
The film revolves around Heer (Firdous), a girl born into a wealthy family, and Ranjha (Ejaz Durrani) the youngest of four brothers, whose journey from his own village takes him to the village where Heer lives after the wives of his brothers refuse him food and mock him. Here, he meets and falls in love with Heer after she offers him work tending her family's  cattle.

However her jealous uncle Kaido has other plans and will stop at nothing to make sure their marriage does not happen.

When Heer is subsequently forced by her father to marry another man, Saida Khera, she broken-heartedly enters a shrine. Ranjha, reciting the name of "Allah", eventually finds her and they are reunited. Their happiness does not last long, as Ranjha is arrested by the local ruler, although he is soon freed and permitted to marry Heer.

On their wedding day, however, Heer's jealous uncle Kaido poisons her. Ranjha, after hearing the calls of Heer's soul screaming his name, comes to realize that her uncle Kaido has killed her. In the film's climax, Ranjha kills Kaido with his own walking stick and then collapses and dies, meeting Heer in the afterlife.

Cast
 M. Ajmal as Kaido
 Ejaz Durrani as Ranjha (played the lead role and was the film producer also) 
 Firdous as Heer
 Najmul Hassan
 Zamurrud
 Munawar Zarif as Saida Khera
 Salma Mumtaz
 Rangeela
 Seema

Songs (album)

Awards
 Nigar Award for Best Punjabi-language Film (1970)
 Nigar Award for Best Director (Punjabi-language films) (1970)
 Nigar Award for Best Music Director (Punjabi-language films) (1970)
 Special Nigar Award to supporting actor M. Ajmal (1970)

References

External links
 Full Heer ranjha story in Urdu
 

1970 films
Punjabi-language Pakistani films
Films scored by Khurshid Anwar
Nigar Award winners
1970s Punjabi-language films
Films directed by Masood Parvez